The Merchant Marine Combat Bar was a decoration of the United States Merchant Marine. The decoration was established by an Act of Congress on 10 May 1943.

Conditions 
The decoration was awarded to members of the Merchant Marine who served on a ship when it was attacked or damaged by an enemy or an instrument of war, such as a mine during the Second World War.  This award is a ribbon bar only.  Further prescribed is the issuance a silver star to be attached to such bar to seamen who are forced to abandon ship when it is so attacked or damaged. For each additional abandonment, an additional star is attached. It is no longer awarded.

See also 
Awards and decorations of the United States government
 Awards and Decorations of the United States Maritime Administration
 Awards and decorations of the United States Merchant Marine
 Awards and decorations of the United States military

External links
 Laws Establishing Merchant Marine Medals

Awards and decorations of the United States Merchant Marine
Awards established in 1943